Decet may refer to :

In music, a decet —sometimes dectet, decimette, or even tentet—is a composition which requires ten musicians for a performance.
Decet Romanum Pontificem (1521) is the papal bull excommunicating Martin Luther.
Romanum decet pontificem is a papal bull issued by Pope Innocent XII (1691—1700) on June 22, 1692, banning the office of Cardinal Nephew.